WEEE-LP, UHF analog channel 32, was a low-power television station licensed to Knoxville, Tennessee, United States. The station was owned by Tiger Eye Broadcasting Corporation. WEEE-LP's  transmitter was located in northern Knoxville.

History 
At some time between 1992 and 1996, Knoxville's channel 32 began as W32BQ. For its first few years on the air, it served as a locally based owned-and-operated translator of the Trinity Broadcasting Network, repeating the signal of flagship KTBN-TV in Santa Ana, California. At some point in 1997, the station was sold to Tiger Eye Broadcasting Corporation. After the sale was finalized, the station changed the call letters to WEEE-LP. At that time, the station began serving as Knoxville's original affiliate of UPN from 1997 until 2004. During that time, in order to fill the programming day outside of UPN's primetime programming, the station also had a secondary affiliation with FamilyNet and, beginning in 2001, Urban America Television. The station shared the affiliations with both UATV and FamilyNet with Heiskell-licensed WFEM-LP (channel 12) to make all FamilyNet and UATV programming available.

On June 28, 2004, the station dropped all three affiliations, including UPN, which moved to WVLT-DT2 (digital channel 34.2/virtual channel 8.2, now a MyNetworkTV affiliate) for the remainder of that network's operating years. June 2004 also marked the event of WEEE-LP becoming an independent station focusing mainly on professional wrestling, boxing and mixed martial arts programming. From that point until its closure in 2006, the station also ran programming from Jewelry Television during the overnight and early morning hours. With the lack of any meaningful local revenue and the lack of a known network, the station soon left the airwaves permanently.

WEEE-LP's license was surrendered to the Federal Communications Commission (FCC) and canceled on March 31, 2021.

References

External links
WEEE-LP Website on Internet Archive’s Wayback Machine - archived August 5, 2003

EEE-LP
Defunct television stations in the United States
Television channels and stations established in 1997
Television channels and stations disestablished in 2021
1997 establishments in Tennessee
2021 disestablishments in Tennessee
EEE-LP